András Máté Gömöri (born August 29, 1992) is an Hungarian actor, bodybuilder and powerlifter

Personal life 
András Máté Gömöri was only 10 years old when he lost his mother, a mathematics teacher, and 16 when his father, an army officer and engineer, passed away. He has two brothers, Péter and Gergely, who are 16 and 12 years his elders respectively. He moved to Kisgyőr with his father, who at the time was living on disability benefits due to heart disease. This is where he spent his childhood, and where his father met Gömöri’s future stepmother, Judit. He moved to a dormitory in Miskolc when he began his studies in Bláthy Ottó Electrical Engineering Vocational Secondary School (Bláthy Ottó Villamosipari Technikum). He spent a lot of time with his elder brother who lived in Miskolc, and later with his other brother, who lived in Pest.

He married Lilla Polyák in the summer of 2018.

Acting career
He was still a child when he got his first role in 2004 in the National Theatre of Miskolc.

He began his studies in the Pesti Magyar Academy of Drama at the Magyar Theatre — the successor of the Nemzeti Stúdió (Academy of the National Theatre) — in 2011, but his attraction gradually shifted from plays to musical theatre. In 2012 he applied for an acting student spot in the Pesti Broadway Studio at the Budapest Operetta Theater, but was offered the main role of Rudolph in the musical Elisabeth instead. From then on, he has acted in musicals such as Romeo and Juliet, Fame, Gone with the Wind, Flowers for Algernon, The Hunchback of Notre Dame, Singin' in the Rain, and Jekyll and Hyde.

In October 2018 he also debuted in prose in the drama The Night of the Tribades in the Pinceszínház located in Budapest.

Between 2017 and 2020 he completed the drama instructor and actor program of the University of Theatre and Film Arts in Budapest. His thesis explored the portrayal of negative characters.

Since 2014 he has appeared in various television series and the Hungarian movie Budapest Noir. For six months in 2018 he hosted the morning show on the television channel FEM3, and from January 2020 he has been hosting a lifestyle show at the channel TV2. He has also been involved with several events and galas. 

In 2019 he was nominated for Playboy’s (Marquard Media Hungary) Man of the Year award in the performance arts category.

Sports career
At school, in addition to playing volleyball and football, he did athletics and participated in triathlons. Later on, he turned to archery, and started competing in 2004. It was around 2010 that he was introduced to gym workouts, which started to play a significant role in his life after moving to Budapest. In 2012, he was already an avid bodybuilder, swimmer and runner. In 2014 he was presented with the Fittest Actor of the Year award at the third Fitbalance Award Gala, which he won again in 2019.

Bodybuilding career
In his first natural bodybuilding competition, which was held by the INBA (International Natural Bodybuilding Association) in Hungary in the summer of 2019, he won the novice as well as the overall category. His trainer was Csaba Kalas, who has won multiple natural bodybuilding championships. In the following year he took a break from competing to focus on his studies, but had already decided to enter the 2021 Natural Olympia in Las Vegas. In the meantime, he was offered a sponsorshipdeal by a nutritional and dietary supplement company.

On October 1, 2021 he won a silver medal in the INBA Elite Tour & Pro Show natural bodybuilding competition in Pécs. This allowed him to enter the world championship on 30 October in Bucharest, where he came in fifth. In November he became the champion and then the overall winner of the Natural Olympia Classic Physique Toll, and earned his pro card. He also won second place in the Open Bodybuilding category in Las Vegas.

Powerlifting career
In 2020 he took up another sport: powerlifting. His first competition was the RAW Powerlifting Hungarian Championship (RAW Erőemelő Magyar Bajnokság) held in 2021 in Budapest. Although his training still focused on bodybuilding, he came in 11 th . In 2021 he became the founding competitor of the newly established powerlifting department of the Diósgyőri VTK sports club. In the Athletes Men’s Open RAW Powerlifting Hungarian Championship (Athletes Férfi Open RAW Erőemelő Magyar Bajnokság) held in April 2022, he finished tenth in the 105 kg group. He was trained by Miklós Fekete, a captain of the National Powerlifting Association and a competitor in Sirius Lifting SE, and Tamás Neszveda powerlifting trainer.

Awards and honors
 Natural Olympia, Las Vegas, 2021
 Classic Physique Overall Champion – pro card winner
 Classic Physique Toll Champion
 Second place – Men's Bodybuilding - Open Tall
 Superbody, Budapest, 2021
 Second place – Superbody Athletic category
 INBA / PNBA World Championships, Bucharest, 2021
 Fifth place
 INBA EliteTour & ProShow, Pécs, 2021
 Second place – Natural Bodybuilding – Open 175+
 INBA Hungary Natural Bodybuilding INBA Grand Prix, Miskolc, 2019
 Bodybuilding Absolute Champion
 Bodybuilding Men’s – Novice 180+ Champion
 Natural Bodybuilding – Open 180+ Champion
 Fitbalance Award Gála 2014, 2019
 Fittest Actor of the Year award
 Csillag-Award (Budapest Operetta Theater), 2013
 Discovery of the Year

Theatrical roles

Filmography

Film

Television

References

External links

 
 
 

1992 births
Living people
Hungarian male stage actors
Hungarian male film actors
Hungarian male television actors
Hungarian bodybuilders